KNAH (99.7 FM) is a commercial radio station airing a classic country radio format. The station is licensed to Mustang, Oklahoma, and serves the Oklahoma City metropolitan area. It is owned by Champlin Broadcasting, Inc. KNAH uses the Hank FM branding from Envision Radio Networks. KNAH competes with rival classic country station 96.1 KXXY-FM, owned by iHeartMedia, Inc.

KNAH's studios and offices are on NW 64th Street in Oklahoma City. The transmitter is off Manning Road in El Reno, Oklahoma.

History
On February 1, 1981, the station signed on the air. It was originally licensed to Alva, Oklahoma, and used the call sign KXLS. The station was owned by Zumma Broadcasting and aired a middle of the road music format, primarily serving Enid and surrounding communities.

The owners eventually got permission from the Federal Communications Commission (FCC) to move the station closer to Oklahoma City to improve its value, with the ability to sell advertising in the more lucrative, larger radio market. The transmitter was relocated northwest of Oklahoma City, with the city of license changed to the suburb Mustang, Oklahoma.

99.7 previously aired an oldies format as KZLS “True Oldies 99.7." It switched to its current format of Classic Country in late September 2013, using Envision Radio Networks' Hank FM branding.

References

External links
Official website

Classic country radio stations in the United States
NAH